The Commonwealth War Graves Commission (CWGC) aims to commemorate the UK and Commonwealth dead of the World Wars, either by maintaining a war grave in a cemetery, or where there is no known grave, by listing the dead on a memorial to the missing. This is a listing of those memorials maintained solely or jointly by the CWGC that commemorate by name the British and Commonwealth dead from World War II whose bodies were not recovered, or whose remains could not be identified.  Also included here are memorials to those who were cremated, and the Rolls of Honour that commemorate land and naval losses of undivided India during the Second World War. This listing is of the CWGC memorials with over 4000 names commemorated. The total number of names inscribed on the memorials or rolls of honour listed here, according to the CWGC figures given in the table below, is 188,971.

List of memorials

See also
 List of Commonwealth War Graves Commission World War I memorials to the missing
 List of Commonwealth War Graves Commission World War I memorials to the missing in Belgium and France

References

Lists of World War II monuments and memorials